Ajit Singh (born 25 November 1960) is an Indian politician from the state of Assam. He served as Member of Assam Legislative Assembly from Udharbond from 1998 to 2016. He also served as a minister of state from 2011 to 2015 and as a cabinet minister from 2015 to 2016. He has contested the Udharbond constituency every election since 1998.

Early life and education 
Singh was born on 25 November 1960. His father was the late Dwarika Prasad Singh and the late Sanjari Devi. Singh has a HSLC from Govt. Boys H.S. School Silchar in 1977 and a BSC From GC College Silchar in the Year 1987.

Political career

Early political career 
Singh was the AGP candidate for the Udharbond constituency in a 1998 by-election. He received 34879 votes, defeating his nearest opponent by 14156 votes and became MLA of Udharbond. Singh later joined Indian National Congress.

Singh was the Indian National Congress candidate in the 2001 Assam Legislative Assembly election for Udharbond. He received 30657 votes, 43.47% of the total vote. He defeated his nearest opponent by 3989 votes.

Singh sought reelection in the 2006 Assam Legislative Assembly election in Udharbond. He received 39432 votes, defeating his nearest opponent by 17245 votes.

Singh again sought reelection in the 2011 Assam Legislative Assembly election in Udharbond. He received 56755 votes, 61.41% of the total vote, defeating his nearest opponent by 44435 votes.

Ministership

Minister of State 
On 27 May 2011, Singh was inducted into the Third Tarun Gogoi cabinet, as one of four ministers of state with independent charge. He became Minister of state for Excise, Sports and Youth Welfare.

In June 2011, Singh distributed funds for the development of sports in rural areas and in women's sports. Singh stated that emphasis will be accorded in the development of rural areas.

In July 2011, during the ongoing session of the state he stated that 116 youths were undergoing training at centres without any coaches.

On 3 March 2012, Singh along with an additional chief secretary visited the Bhuvan Valley Tea estate, at the behest of Chief Minister Tarun Gogoi due to 14 tea works dying, possibly of starvation.

Singh attended the meeting in honour of 150th birth anniversary of Rabindranath Tagore.

On 29 June 2012, Singh along with irrigation minister Ardhendu Kumar Dey visited several flooded areas in Barak Valley by boat.

Following the ASEAN car rally in December 2012, in an evening Singh hosted a dinner.

After the delaying of a 201 km broad gauge project connecting Lumding with Silchar, hundreds of protesters gathered outside Singh's house requesting the immediate completion of the railway project.

In June 2013, following the return of Everesters from Assam, Singh attended the reception for their return.

In August 2013, after Chief Minister Tarun Gogoi asked for the revival of Assam Flying Club, the sports commissioner submitted minutes of meetings to Singh.

Singh resigned along with all members of the cabinet on 19 January 2015.

Cabinet Minister 
Singh was inducted into the new ministry, however he was promoted to a cabinet minister. He was made minister for excise, sports and youth welfare.

On 26 April 2015, Singh, while speaking at a function in the premises of the flag station here today, said his ministry "has laid stress on development of better infrastructure for augmenting the fleet of bus services and also modernization, keeping in view the increasing number of commuters and their expectations of better services from the ASTC". He also addressed how this was his vision for Barak Valley, and other areas.

In the 2016 Assam Legislative assembly election, Singh sought reelection in Udharbond. He received 45598 votes, 40.65% of the total vote. He was defeated by BJP candidate and the incumbent MLA of Udharbond Mihir Kanti Shome by 8606 votes. He was one of ten cabinet ministers who lost in the election.

Post-ministerial career 
In the 2021 Assam Legislative Assembly election, Singh was again the Indian National Congress for Udharbond. He received 59060 votes, 45.28% of the total vote. He again lost to Mihir Kanti Shome by 2685 votes.

Personal life 
Singh married Smt. Kusum Singh on 11 March 1993 and they had one daughter and one son. Singh enjoys reading, travelling, sports and gardening. He also enjoys watching TV and reading books and journals. He enjoys working for the upliftment of the weaker sections of society and he attended a three-month conference in Singapore related to Trade Union activities.

Positions 

 Assistant General Secretary, Cachar Sramik Union.
 Assistant General Secretary, INTUC
 Chairman, INTUC, Young Council, Assam and other socio-economic organisations
 General Secretary, Indian National Plantation Workers Federation
 Secretary, APCC (I)
 Vice Chairman, Assam Livestock & Poultry Farm
 MLA Udharbond 
 Chairman, Petition Committee in 11th ALA
 Member, STA
 Chairman, ATDC
 Parliamentary Secretary, Finance, Government of Assam
 Minister of State (IC), Excise and Sports & Youth Welfare, Government of Assam 
 Cabinet Minister for excise, sports and youth welfare

References 

Assam MLAs 2001–2006
Assam MLAs 2006–2011
Assam MLAs 2011–2016
State cabinet ministers of Assam
1960 births
Living people
Asom Gana Parishad politicians
Indian National Congress politicians from Assam
People from Cachar district